Theodore Roosevelt Boyett (August 2, 1912 – August 17, 1987) was an American football coach.  Boyett was the head football coach at Adrian College in Adrian, Michigan. He held that position for the 1951 and 1952 seasons. His coaching record at Adrian was 3–11–1.  He was a graduate of the University of New Mexico (late 1930s) and University of Missouri.

Head coaching record

References

External links
 

1912 births
1987 deaths
Adrian Bulldogs football coaches
University of Missouri alumni
University of New Mexico alumni